Rob Wotton is a soccer  presenter for Sky Sports and on Sky Sports News. He is a fan of Chelsea FC and his commentary has appeared on their club DVD.

He has covered England games home and away for Capital Gold and worked with Jonathan Pearce.

Career 
As part of the team that kicked Sky Sports News off way back in 1998, he has become a fixture on the screens and has presented most of, if not all, of the shows at one time or another.

His most regular role though is the early Saturday evening slot, where he takes the viewers through the Premier League talking points and Football League goals as soon as Jeff Stelling and the Soccer Saturday boys are off air. Before beginning his 12-year service (and counting) Wotton was the sports editor at Capital Radio in London, where Euro 96 and the 1998 World Cup in France were among the highlights, as well as annual broadcasts from Wimbledon. Since joining Sky Sports News, Wotton has presented a number of our frontline football productions, including several seasons as the anchor for our popular La Liga coverage and the weekly magazine show Revista de la Liga.

He has also fronted our Bundesliga coverage, Northern Irish football and Schoolboy internationals - as well as being part of Sky Sports News' team for Euro 2004 in Portugal. Away from football he has also worked on IndyCar coverage.

References

British sports broadcasters
Alumni of the University of Chester
Living people
Year of birth missing (living people)